The Adam RA-15 Major was a French sporting plane developed and produced in the decade after World War II.

Development
The RA-15 was developed in 1948 as a higher-powered successor to the Adam RA-14 Loisirs, utilising a number of refinements including a plywood-covered fuselage and an enlarged rudder. It was a side-by-side two-seater with dual controls, wooden construction and a fabric-covered two-spar wing which folded for storage in hangars. The Major was designed to use any flat-four engine in the 65-75 h.p. range.

Production and operational history
A small series of Majors was produced in the late 1940s and early 1950s. The basic RA-15 was fitted with the 75 h.p. Regnier 4D-2 engine and the RA-151 had the 75 hp Continental C75 engine. Two Majors were still active in 1965.

Variants
RA-15 Major
RA-17 a modified single seat crop dusting variant of the RA-15.
Maranda BM3Canadian production of the RA-17 by the Maranda Aircraft Company

Specification (RA-15)

References

Notes

Bibliography

1940s French civil utility aircraft
High-wing aircraft
Single-engined tractor aircraft
Aircraft first flown in 1948